Chaos Now (stylized as CHAOS NOW*) is the second studio album by experimental pop musician Jean Dawson, released on October 7, 2022, by the artist's label P+. The album was announced August 19 along with the release of single "Three Heads", with a music video directed by Bradley J. Calder, as well as the artist's first US headlining tour. "Porn Acting" was released as a prior single on February 27, third single "Pirate Radio" followed on September 16, and fourth single "Sick of It" released September 29.

Background 
In an interview with Maxine Wally for W, Dawson admitted difficulty with completing the album. He spent months in his bedroom in Inglewood, California working on it, comparing his room to "those movies where a dude is trying to figure out a crime and they have pieces of yarn connected to pins on the wall." He also admitted to scrapping two previous versions of the album, one which resembled an EP which Dawson says he "vehemently" hates, and the other because it wasn't "profound enough. I was just saying words."

Style and reception 

Clashs James Mellen calls the album "a shapeshifting creation, blasting through acoustic balladry, hip-hop elements and frantic distorted guitars." Mellen considers "Glory" "a song ready for arenas" with "reverb-soaked drums matched by the heavy guitars" and "Dawson's searing vocals"; says "Bad Fruit", featuring "alternative hip hop heavyweight" Earl Sweatshirt, "is a softer number on the album" with "sombre guitar work", orchestral passages, and "twinkling percussion" adding "a cinematic dimension to the track"; calls closing track "Pirate Radio" "a beautiful acoustic moment spurred on by delicate guitars and folk-tinted strings and wind sections"; and closes by saying the album "took everything that made Pixel Bath so incredible and just elevates it."

DIYs Emma Swann calls the album "an exhilarating meeting of grunge, pop-punk and indie with hip hop rhythms", comparing to "Beck if he'd used a palette of early '00s MTV2." Swann further compares "Three Heads" as "mak[ing] like Bloc Party's "Helicopter" at slow speed to soundtrack a nu metal vocal break", "0-Heroes" as "giv[ing] Nirvana guitars a stadium-sized chorus", says "Screw Face" and "Porn Acting" "could've fallen right out of Fidlar's catalogue", and notes "a smirk towards Billie Eilish's "Bury a Friend" amid the industrial glitches" of "Kids Eat Pills". Swann concludes by quoting intro track "*" where Dawson asks "Fuck y'all looking at?", saying "A superstar, is the answer."

In a more negative review, The Line of Best Fits Kyle Kohner says that Dawson "stagnates in the groove of his zany musical habits". While Dawson "communicates what it means and what it could look like to embrace your inner-outsider", Kohner feels "often left waiting for that sentiment to manifest in full musically, by subverting genre conventions with a foot unflinchingly pressed on the proverbial gas pedal of experimentalism." Chaos Now is "not the genre-eliminating record that [Dawson] had declared it to be and that many had hoped for", instead adopting "the same scraped-together, playlist-emulating approach with little-to-no push to be even weirder."

Track listing 
All tracks except 1 stylized in all caps with an asterisk at the end (e.g. "THREE HEADS*").

Personnel 
 Jean Dawson – vocals, executive producer
 Nathan Phillips – mixing engineer
 Dale Becker – mastering engineer

Charts

References 

2022 albums
Jean Dawson albums
Grunge albums
Pop punk albums by Mexican artists
Pop punk albums by American artists
Indie rock albums by Mexican artists
Indie rock albums by American artists
Hip hop albums by Mexican artists
Hip hop albums by American artists